Samundar (meaning "ocean" in Urdu) was a Pakistani television serial presented by the PTV network. The show was broadcast from the PTV Lahore center and was directed by Yawar Hayat and Qasim Jalali, Amjad Islam Amjad wrote the script. The drama serial is one of the most famous dramas from PTV. It is remembered to this day due to its unique story line and huge star cast.

Characters and cast
Samundar The noun "Samundar" is Amjad Islam Amjad's metaphorical reference to the world that surrounds us all. An Abyss full of unique human characteristics, frailties and triumphant human spirit. The Drama tells the story of FIVE unique friends bonded together by friendship and a common purpose in business partnership. Their lives are essentially torn apart by greed, lust for wealth, impulsive power, scandalous ambition and lack of mores. The FIVE friends also display a unique set of characteristics, personifying individuality and though a friendship bond but a unique perspective of life          
Shabaz Khan (Mehboob Alam): is a feudal lord who descends from the centuries-old socioeconomically stagnant and yet dominant Agrarian Indo-Asian culture. He represents all that is historically wrong with the systemic Feudal landownership system. He is a tenacious blowhard, power-mongering, aggressive proto-businessman. He uses any means necessary to force and maintain his egotistical control over the world that surrounds him. He is the dominant of the 5 partners, more solemn and decisive in action and believes in short term solutions      
Qadeer (Nisar Qadri): A meager and yet shrewd salvage business owner who brings to the partnership table a cunning extra sense, a worldly practical perspective, self-serving impulse, diabolical survival instinct, and a hobby and knack for knowing a variety of exotic poisons. He is pragmatic, and relies heavily on using lingual metaphors to memorize any listener. He is also astute negotiator and possess a skillful art of measurements and assessment     
Ibrahim (Irfan Khoosat): is a self-absorbed, passive, surreptitious, petty and incredulous large person. He brings to the business partnership almost entirely an ebb of fellowship, although he can turn on a dime with absolute vengeance and surmounting hunger for gains  
Nosheen (Bindiya), The effervescent socially gifted strong minded feminist first born of Khan Shabaz Khan. She carries a soft caring interior over a hard tenacious defensive shell. She represents the clan's Feudal hegemonic powerful facade. She is feisty, flirtatious and holds no grudges     
Nasir (Asif Raza Mir), The prodigal eldest son of "Baqar", one of the FIVE partners. An idealist and a progressive thinker and a graduating medical doctor. He aspires to change the centuries-old traditionalism, although nearly always confines himself to a traditional upbringing as the "good son".   
Yasir (Waseem Abbas), The central character in this play. The younger of the Baqar's boys who happens to kick off this titillating and suspenseful drama when he is Bailed out by Ahmed Kamal, only to find himself working for him in efforts to avenge his father's murderers   
Sidra (Arifa Siddiqui), a happy go lucky girl for whom fate has something else in store
Jeeran (Sarwat Ateeq), who has hidden a dark secret in her heart for so many years
Tanveer (Tauqeer Nasir), who can go to any extent to take revenge
Mehroz (Mohammad Zubair), a wealthy boy
Gullu (Abid Kashmiri), a rickshaw driver with a heart of gold
Sumaira (Sehrish Khan), who is unaware of her past
Tabasum (Shakila Qureshi), for whom life is a burden
Najeeb (Mehmood Aslam), a spoilt student and uses his father's position and money to destroy others
Qamar un Nisa (Nighat Butt), an evil woman who destroyed the lives of several girls for her own advantage
Nasir and Yasir's mother (Khursheed Shahid), a kind mother who wants to see her children happy
Tehseen (Poonam), a practical and caring young woman
Zaman (Abid Ali), related in some way to all these characters and plays an important part everyone's life

References

Pakistani drama television series
Urdu-language television shows
Pakistan Television Corporation original programming
Television shows set in Karachi